Kaisa Yeh Junoon is a Pakistani television series directed by Raana Sheikh, who also wrote the scrrenplay with dialogues by Haseena Moin. It first aired in 2007 on ARY Digital and focuses on the subjects of terrorism and religious extremism. The series has Azfar Rehman, Ayesha Omar, Adnan Siddiqui, Madiha Iftikhar, and Savera Nadeem in leading roles.

It received three nominations at the 8th Lux Style Awards, including Best TV Play - Satellite.

Cast 

 Madiha Iftikhar
 Adnan Siddiqui
 Ayesha Omar
 Azfar Rehman
 Savera Nadeem
 Saba Hameed
 Asif Raza Mir
 Kiron Kher
 Ali Kazmi
 Hassan Niazi
 Farah Nadeem

Production 
According to director Raana Sheikh, she was first asked to direct the series in the Indian style, with over-the-top and exaggerated production. The series marked the acting debut of Rehman and her first appearance with Omar, the others being Roza Kay Rozy, Miss U Kabhi Kabhi, and Bisaat. The series marked the appearance of Bollywood actress Kiron Kher, who played the supporting role in the series in her first Pakistani TV drama.

The series was shot in London, Bombay, and Karachi.

Accolades

References 

Pakistani drama television series
2007 Pakistani television series debuts
Urdu-language television shows
2007 Pakistani television series endings
ARY Digital original programming